Eagleview is a census-designated place (CDP) in Uwchlan Township, Chester County, Pennsylvania. The population was 1,644 at the 2010 census.  

Eagleview was created as "... an old fashion town where you can work, live, shop, see your elders, and care for the young all in the same place."  According to a Landsat imagery, the Eagleview shopping center represents a medium density development that generated 400 square feet more living space per acre per the source than lower density developments also shown in the same imagery.  Stevens, in his book on a study of how to make communities safer in new urban developments uses Eagleview, along with Weatherstone, as sample data for comparing amount of green space for every acreage of development.  The community was listed in volume 6 of the New Urban News as an example of this new type of housing development.

The shopping district inside the census designated place of the same name contains a mixed use community of stores, restaurants, and residential units with "walkable streets" and green spaces according to the official website.

Geography

Eagleview is located at  along the northwest border of Uwchlan Township. Pennsylvania Route 100, also known as Pottstown Pike, forms the northeastern edge of Eagleview, including Route 100's connection to Exit 312 of the Pennsylvania Turnpike.

See also
Weatherstone, Pennsylvania

References

External links

Census-designated places in Chester County, Pennsylvania
Census-designated places in Pennsylvania
Lifestyle centers (retail)